The Borough of Koroit was a local government area about  northwest of Warrnambool in western Victoria, Australia. The borough covered an area of  immediately to the north of the Tower Hill State Game Reserve, and existed from 1870 until 1985.

It was first incorporated on 7 October 1870. On 1 June 1985, the borough was united with the Shire of Warrnambool as the Koroit Riding.

Population

* Estimates in 1958 and 1988 Victorian Year Books.

References

External links
 Victorian Places - Koroit

Koroit